Compendium may refer to:
Compendium, a Wikipedia article defining the word 'compendium'. 
Compendium Books, a London bookstore specialising in experimental literary and theoretical publications. 
Compendium of Chemical Terminology, a book published by the International Union of Pure and Applied Chemistry (IUPAC).
Compendium Maleficarum, a witch-hunter's manual written in Latin by Francesco Maria Guazzo, and published in Milan, Italy in 1608.
Compendium of Materia Medica, a Chinese medical book written by Li Shizhen during the Ming Dynasty.
Compendium of postage stamp issuers (F), a collection of entries about stamp issuers beginning with the letter 'F'.
Compendium of postage stamp issuers (J), a collection of entries about stamp issuers beginning with the letter 'J'.
Compendium of the Catechism of the Catholic Church, a catechism promulgated for the Catholic Church by Pope John Paul II in 1992.
Compendium (software), a computer program and social science tool that facilitates the mapping and management of ideas and arguments.
Compendium: The Best of Patrick Street, a year 2000 compilation album by the Irish folk band Patrick Street.